The mill cottage on the Lion Gardiner farm at 36 James Lane on the landmarked East Hampton Village green has become a museum displaying 19th and early-20th-century landscape paintings. It is a contributing structure on the NRHP East Hampton Village District, replacing the original cottage on the lot situated with the windmill and Rev James historic marker.

History
By community request of the village board, the Town of East Hampton purchased the Gardiner Mill cottage and lot, which included the 1804 Gardiner windmill, in 2014 utilizing  community preservation funding. In December 2014, the village signed off on an agreement to build a replica saltbox style colonial era home and took sole responsibility for a museum. Terry Wallace, owner of the East Hampton Wallace Gallery had agreed to partly donate some of his collection of landscape paintings of the Hamptons (some dating to 1865), while the rest would be acquired by a sizable endowment to the museum funded by the Robert David Lion Gardiner Foundation.

The Cottage
The mill cottage and later added extensions and dormers is a colonial-era timber-frame saltbox. It was restored to its 1880s appearance, when it was last renovated by Jonathan Thompson Gardiner. The artist Percy Moran, a nephew of renowned artist Thomas Moran of the Hudson River School of painting, lived there in the early-20th century and the cottage had fallen into dis-repair. The decision to replace the structure with a replica was cast as a compromise to restoration.
Some nonhistorical add-ons to the original cottage, including porches and dormers, were removed, and the 1880 front porch was reconstructed. A previous kitchen would be recreated to provide an entrance and bathroom to comply with the Americans With Disabilities Act. A small parking lot was placed behind the cottage so as to not impede street views.

The Mill

The Gardiner Mill, built in 1804, is a New England style smock windmill built by Millwright Nathanial Dominy V. and operated as a grist mill serving area farmers. The timber used for the mill was cut from trees on Gardiner's Island and it was finished on September 28, 1804, costing more than 528 pounds ($28,208 in 2018). The mill continued to operate until 1900 and retained much of its original machinery, it has the best representation of colonial style interior finish of the extant Long Island windmills and remains the best example of millwrighting craftsmanship by Nathaniel Dominy V, who also worked on other area windmills. Nathaniel Dominy is said to have given particular attention to detail in the workings of the Gardiner Mill frame and had worked the timbers to a smooth finish with a hand plane. Dominy made this extra effort partly due to this being the first of a kind, a new model windmill which was crafted to run two sets of millstones instead of one, and also because he built it for his major patron, John Lyon Gardiner. It was completely renovated in 1996 by the Village which created a state-of-the-art restoration of the Windmill.

References

National Register of Historic Places in East Hampton (town), New York
East Hampton (village), New York
Historic districts on the National Register of Historic Places in New York (state)
Historic districts in Suffolk County, New York
National Register of Historic Places in Suffolk County, New York
Mill museums in New York (state)
Saltbox architecture in New York
Smock mills in the United States
Windmills in New York (state)
Windmills on the National Register of Historic Places